Thiollierea kaalaensis is a species of flowering plant in the family Rubiaceae. It is endemic to New Caledonia.

References

Endemic flora of New Caledonia
Endangered plants
kaalaensis
Taxonomy articles created by Polbot